The Golden Hind was an English galleon captained by Sir Francis Drake.

Golden Hind or Golden Hinde may also refer to:
 Golden Hind (mythology), an enormous deer in Greek mythology
 Golden Hinde (mountain), a mountain on Vancouver Island, British Columbia, Canada
 Golden Hind (passenger train), a train in the United Kingdom
 , a replica of Drake's Golden Hind
 , see Boats of the Mackenzie River watershed